Jostein Stordahl (born 20 May 1966) is a Norwegian disabled sportsperson. He has competed in sailing and wheelchair curling at the Paralympic Games as well as elsewhere.

References

External links 

Profile at the Official Website for the 2010 Winter Paralympics in Vancouver

1966 births
Living people
Paralympic sailors of Norway
Norwegian male sailors (sport)
Norwegian male curlers
Norwegian wheelchair curlers
Paralympic wheelchair curlers of Norway
Paralympic medalists in wheelchair curling
Paralympic silver medalists for Norway
Sailors at the 1996 Summer Paralympics
Sailors at the 2000 Summer Paralympics
Sailors at the 2004 Summer Paralympics
Sailors at the 2008 Summer Paralympics
Wheelchair curlers at the 2010 Winter Paralympics
Wheelchair curlers at the 2014 Winter Paralympics
Wheelchair curlers at the 2018 Winter Paralympics
Wheelchair curlers at the 2022 Winter Paralympics
Medalists at the 2018 Winter Paralympics
World wheelchair curling champions